The Pwersa ng Masang Pilipino, formerly Partido ng Masang Pilipino, is a populist political party in the Philippines. It is the political party of former Philippine President Joseph E. Estrada. In the May 1998 presidential election, it aligned itself with other political parties to form the Laban ng Makabayang Masang Pilipino (Struggle of the Patriotic Filipino Masses).

History
Originally named the Partido ng Masang Pilipino, the Pwersa ng Masang Pilipino emanated from an organization which was an offshoot of the Economic Recovery Action Program (ERAP) organized by George S. Antonio in May 1990. The ERAP organization was formally launched on October 4, 1990 with 21 original members.

The organization grew exponentially with the recruitment of members nationwide. It was then that the PMP was accredited as a political party with the objective of helping to uplift the lives of the Filipino people, especially the poor and the disadvantaged, through effective and efficient social and economic reforms. Its first campaign headquarters was located at the 4th floor of San Buena Building, EDSA corner Shaw Boulevard, Mandaluyong. On August 20, 1991, PMP was formally accredited as a national political party.

In 1992, PMP took its first major political step by fielding then-Senator Joseph Estrada as its vice-presidential candidate together with other local candidates. Estrada became the running mate of Eduardo "Danding" Cojuangco Jr., the standard-bearer of the Nationalist People's Coalition (NPC). Estrada overwhelmingly won the vice-presidency, defeating former Chief Justice Marcelo Fernan of the Laban ng Demokratikong Pilipino along with five other candidates.

In 1997, a permanent and fully operational headquarters was established at 409 Shaw Boulevard in Mandaluyong. In the 1998 Philippine general election, PMP was very much involved in the election with the candidacy of Estrada as president and other local candidates nationwide. PMP played a lead role in the establishment of the opposition coalition Laban ng Makabayang Masang Pilipino (LAMMP), which also counted among its members the LDP and NPC. The coalition fielded full slates for the national and local levels. Card-bearing members reached as high as 3.2 million nationwide. Estrada won the presidential election, garnering almost 11 million votes and defeating nine other candidates  including House Speaker Jose de Venecia Jr. of Lakas–NUCD–UMDP.

In 2001, PMP led the opposition coalition, fielding senatorial candidates from People's Reform Party and LDP as well as independent candidates. The Puwersa ng Masa coalition won four seats in the Senate, including one for Estrada's wife Luisa "Loi" Ejercito Estrada.

In 2003, the party's name Partido ng Masang Pilipino was changed to Pwersa ng Masang Pilipino. In April 2004, the PMP agreed to enter into a coalition with the LDP and Partido Demokratiko Pilipino–Lakas ng Bayan (PDP–Laban) to form the Koalisyon ng Nagkakaisang Pilipino (KNP), the dominant opposition coalition for the 2004 Philippine general election. The coalition fielded actor Fernando Poe Jr. and Senator Loren Legarda as candidates for president and vice-president, respectively. Poe and Legarda lost the election to incumbent President Gloria Macapagal Arroyo and Senator Noli de Castro.

In office
Today, PMP occupies three Senate seats as a member of the minority floor, occupied by Estrada's wife,
Luisa Ejercito Estrada, who won in 2001, his son, former San Juan suburb Mayor Jinggoy Estrada and long-time Estrada colleague veteran politician Juan Ponce Enrile, the last two winning in 2004.

In the May 14, 2007 election, the party won three seats in the House of Representatives. Members of the Philippine House of Representatives are elected to serve three year terms.

In the 17th Congress the party held one senate seat held by Estrada's son JV Ejercito, due to most members switching sides to PDP–Laban or UNA.

In the news
On January 18, 2008, Joseph Estrada's Partido ng Masang Pilipino (PMP) placed full-page advertisements in Metro Manila newspapers, blaming EDSA 2  of having "inflicted a dent on Philippine democracy". Its featured clippings questioned the constitutionality of the revolution. The published featured clippings were taken from Time, New York Times, Straits Times, Los Angeles Times, Washington Post, Asia Times Online, The Economist, and International Herald Tribune. Former Supreme Court justice Cecilia Muñoz Palma opined that EDSA 2 violated the 1987 Constitution.

Alfredo Lim, on August 20, 2008, resigned as head of Joseph Estrada's Pwersa ng Masang Pilipino (Partido ng Masang Pilipino –  PMP) following a PMP's executive committee resolution removing him as president of the party. He was replaced by Joseph Estrada who is also the PMP chairman.

PMP-affiliated parties
Partido Magdiwang – San Juan
Partido Navoteño – Navotas
Asenso Manileño - City of Manila (until 2019)
Partido Magdalo – Cavite
Hugpong ng Pagbabago – Davao Region

Notable members
Joseph Estrada –  13th President of Philippines, 11th Vice President, Senator, former San Juan Mayor, former Manila Mayor 
Loi Estrada –  Former Senator and 12th First Lady of the Philippines 
Jinggoy Estrada –  Acting Senate President, 22nd Senate President Pro-Temporate of the Philippines, Senator, former San Juan Mayor and Vice-Mayor. 
Juan Ponce Enrile –  26th Senate President, Senator, Minister (Secretary) of National Defense, Assemblyman for Cagayan Valley, and Congressman of the 1st District of Cagayan. 
Joseph Victor Ejercito –  Senator, Congressman & former Mayor of San Juan; Lone district of San Juan 
Guia Gomez –  Mayor of San Juan, First Lady of San Juan (to then Mayor Joseph Ejercito-Estrada) 
Tobias Reynald Tiangco –  Congressman & former Mayor of Navotas; Lone district of Navotas 
John Reynald Tiangco –  Mayor of Navotas 
Melencio "Jun" De Sagun, Jr. –  former Mayor of Trece Martires 
Melandres De Sagun –  Mayor of Trece Martires 
Leonisa Joana "Ona" Virata –  Mayor of General Mariano Alvarez, Cavite 
Harry William Acosta –  Sangguniang Kabataan Federation, Pasay, former PMP Youth Chairman of National Capital Region 
Didagen Dilangalen –  former Congressman of 1st district of Maguindanao 
Atty. Rufus Rodriguez –  Congressman of 2nd district of Cagayan de Oro City 
Jonvic Remulla –  Governor of Cavite 
Boying Remulla –  Congressman of 7th District of Cavite 
Jocel Baac –  Governor of Kalinga 
Emilio Ramon Ejercito –  Governor of Laguna 
Armando Sanchez –  former Governor of Batangas (deceased) 
Lito Atienza –  former Mayor of Manila, Mambabatas Pambansa (Assemblyman) from Manila, Vice Mayor of Manila, Secretary of Environment and Natural Resources 
Connie Dy –  former Representative of  Pasay 
Hermogenes "HB" Perez, Sr. –  former Mayor of Hagonoy, Bulacan 
Roberto Oca –  former Mayor of Pandi, Bulacan 
Edwin C. Santos –  Businessman Obando, Bulacan 
Romeo G. Ramos – Mayor Cavite City
Francisco M. Domagoso –  Mayor of Manila, former Vice Mayor of Manila, former director of North Luzon Railways Corporation, former undersecretary of Social Welfare and Development 
Gary Jayson Ejercito-Estrada – Incumbent Board Member of Quezon Province 2nd district

Candidates for Philippine General Elections 2010

Joseph Estrada – Presidential Candidate (lost)
Jejomar Binay – Vice-Presidential Candidate (won)
Senatorial Slate (8)
JV Bautista (lost)
Juan Ponce Enrile (won)
Jinggoy Estrada (won)
Jun Lozada (lost)
Regalado Maambong (lost)
Francisco Tatad (lost)
Rodolfo Plaza (lost)
Joey de Venecia (lost)

Candidates for the 2013 Philippine general election

Senatorial Slate (9)
United Nationalist Alliance

Nancy Binay, PDP–Laban (won)
Tingting Cojuangco, PDP–Laban (lost)
JV Ejercito Estrada, PMP (won)
Jack Enrile, Nationalist People's Coalition (lost)
Dick Gordon, Bagumbayan-VNP (lost)
Gringo Honasan, Independent (won)
Ernesto Maceda, Jr., PMP (lost)
Mitos Magsaysay, PDP–Laban (lost)
Migz Zubiri, PMP (lost)

Candidates for the 2016 Philippine general election
Rommel Mendoza – Presidential Candidate (backed out, supported the candidacy of former Vice President Jejomar Binay)

Senatorial Slate
Isko Moreno (lost)
Sandra Cam (lost)

Electoral performance

Presidential and vice presidential elections

Legislative elections

References

Political parties established in 1991
Populist parties
1991 establishments in the Philippines